Kinsley Park was an athletic field, used for professional football, minor league baseball and pro soccer, located in Providence, Rhode Island at the corner of Kinsley Avenue (north, third base) and Acorn Street (west, first base), across Acorn from the Nicholson File Company Mill Complex. The field was used primarily by Providence Steam Roller, Providence Grays and the Providence Gold Bugs. The park was built primarily by Peter Laudati, a prominent Providence real estate developer and a part-owner of the Providence Steam Roller. He also built the Steam Roller's second stadium, the Cycledrome. During the 1930s the New York Yankees, featuring Babe Ruth and Lou Gehrig played an exhibition game at that park.

First NFL night game
The field is best known for hosting the first night game in NFL history on November 6, 1929, between the Steam Roller and the Chicago Cardinals. The game ended in a 16-0 Cardinals victory behind the running, passing and kicking of Ernie Nevers, who scored all of the games 16 points. He rushed 23 times for 102 yards and a touchdown. He also completed 10 of 15 passes for 144 yards and another touchdown. He also kicked a 33-yard field goal and an extra point.

The game was scheduled for Sunday November 3, however heavy rains made the Cyclodome unplayable. Rather than lose a contest with a high probability for a nice payday, the historic night game was hastily scheduled.

The game was considered a success because at least 6,000 spectators attended. According to newspaper accounts, the ball had been painted white so that it would be easier to see. The floodlights were also described as being just as good as daylight for the players. The Providence Journal, at the time, described the system as “33 giant projectors on poles 53 feet high, and nine poles on top of the grandstand.” Floodlights were then installed the next year at the Cyclodome and other NFL teams began playing at night as well. According to his 1930 contract with the Providence Steam Roller, which is now in the Pro Football Hall of Fame archives, Tony Latone was paid $125 for all NFL daylight games and 60 percent of that sum for NFL "floodlight" games. One of the original team's founders Pearce Johnson explained that the pay reduction for night games was arranged to help pay the installation costs of the floodlights at the Cyclodome.

Night soccer games
On October 6, 1929, the American Soccer League had suspended operations on October 9, pending a merger with the rival Eastern League of Professional Soccer. Hoping to regenerate fan interest during the situation, the Gold Bugs had cobbled together an exhibition schedule. The team then began playing under the new lights at Kinsley Park. On October 31, 1929 the Gold Bugs defeated the Boston Wonder Workers, 2-1.

Kinsley Park was closed by the end of 1931. It was torn down in 1933 and no trace of the field remains.

References

Rhode Island Artin Ruins: Providence Cyclodome

Buildings and structures in Providence, Rhode Island
Baseball venues in Rhode Island
Defunct National Football League venues
Soccer venues in Rhode Island
1931 disestablishments in Rhode Island
Sports venues demolished in 1933
American football venues in Rhode Island
Demolished sports venues in the United States